George Marr Flemington Gillon  (born November 1942) is a councilman of the City of London Corporation where he represents the ward of Cordwainer. He was master of the Worshipful Company of Chartered Surveyors in 2002/2003. He was Sheriff of London from 2008 to 2009 and Chief Commoner of the Court of Common Council for 2013/2014.

Gillon was appointed Member of the Order of the British Empire (MBE) in the 2017 New Year Honours for services to the City of London Corporation and the Scottish community in London.

References 

Living people
1942 births
Councilmen and Aldermen of the City of London
Sheriffs of the City of London
Chartered Surveyors
Members of the Order of the British Empire
Place of birth missing (living people)